Dead on the Bones: Pulp on Fire is a collection of novellas and short stories written by American author Joe R. Lansdale. He dedicated this work to his major influences of his youth: Edgar Rice Burroughs and Robert E. Howard. All the stories were written by Lansdale. This book was also dedicated to longtime collaborator artist Timothy Truman and is limited to 1500 copies published by Subterranean Press of Burton, Michigan. It's also available as a Kindle E-Book.

Table of contents
The Gruesome Affair of the Electric Blue Lightning
The Redhead Dead
King of the Cheap Romance
Naked Angel
Dead on the Bones
Tarzan and the Land That Time forgot
Under the Warrior Star
The Wizard of the Trees

References

External links
Author's website
Publisher's website
Artist's website

Short story collections by Joe R. Lansdale
Works by Joe R. Lansdale
2016 short story collections
Subterranean Press books